The following outline is provided as an overview of and topical guide to communication:

Communication – purposeful activity of exchanging information and meaning across space and time using various technical or natural means, whichever is available or preferred. Communication requires a sender, a message, a medium and a recipient, although the receiver does not have to be present or aware of the sender's intent to communicate at the time of communication; thus communication can occur across vast distances in time and space.

Essence of communication 

Communication theory
Development communication
Information
Information theory
Semiotics

Branches of communication

Types of communication

Types of communication by scope 

 Intercultural communication
 International communication
 Interpersonal communication
 Intrapersonal communication
 Mass communication
 Nonverbal communication
 Organizational communication

Types of communication by mode 

 Computer-mediated communication
 Conversation
 Mail
 Mass media
 Book
 Film
 Journalism
 News media
 Newspaper
 Technical writing
 Video
 Telecommunication   (outline)
 Morse Code
 Radio
 Telegraphy
 Telephone
 Television
 Internet
 Verbal communication
 Writing
 Social Network

Fields of communication 

Communication studies
Cognitive linguistics
Conversation analysis
Crisis communication
Discourse analysis
Environmental communication
Health communication
Interpersonal communication
Linguistics
Mass communication
Mediated cross-border communication
Organizational communication
Political communication
Pragmatics
Risk communication
Science communication
Semiotics
Sociolinguistics

Theories, schools, and approaches 

Theories of communication
Agenda-setting theory
Content analysis
Community structure theory
Conversation analysis
Coordinated management of meaning
Critical theory
Cues-filtered-out theory
Cultivation theory
Cultural studies
Cybernetics
Decision downloading
Diffusion of innovations
Elaboration likelihood model
Ethnomethodology
Framing
Hermeneutics
Hypodermic needle model
Heuristic-Systematic Model
Hyperpersonal Model
Information theory
Knowledge gap hypothesis
Media ecology
Narrative paradigm
Network analysis
Nonviolent Communication
Opinion leadership
Political economy
Priming
Problematic Integration Theory
Relational dialectics
Scheme (linguistics)
Social learning theory
Social construction of reality
Social Identity model of Deindividuation Effects (SIDE)
Social Information Processing theory
Social Penetration Theory
Spiral of silence
Structuralism
Symbolic interactionism
Technology acceptance model
Theory of cognitive dissonance
Theory of Planned Behavior
Theory of Reasoned Action
Third-person effect
Two-step flow of communication
Uses and gratifications
Uncertainty reduction theory

History of communication 

History of communication
 Cave painting
 Early postal systems
 Heliograph
 Historical linguistics
 History of alphabet
 History of the book
 History of computer science
 History of computing (see also Timeline of computing)
 History of computer hardware
 History of Internet
 History of linguistics
 History of mass media
 History of radio
 History of telegraphy
 History of telegraph
 History of telephone
 History of television
 History of writing
 Ideograms
 Origin of language
 Petroglyphs
 Pictograms
 Proto-language
 Semaphore line
 Smoke signals

General communication concepts

General topics of communication 
Autocommunication
Empathy
People skills
Persuasion
Propaganda
Public speaking
Reading
Rhetoric
Small-group communication
Speech
Translation
Writing

General communication terms 
Censorship
Community structure
Cultural imperialism
Democracy
Dialectic
Digital divide
Freedom of the press
Freedom of speech
Hegemony
Identity
Imagined community
Information society
Late capitalism
Media imperialism
Morpheme
Nationalism
Phoneme
Postmodernity
Public sphere
Semiotics
Social capital
Social network
Sophist
Stereotyping
Stigma
Syllable
Transactive communication
Universal service
Avatar (virtual reality)

Communication scholars 
Theodor Adorno
Aristotle
Roland Barthes
Gregory Bateson
Walter Benjamin
Kenneth Burke
Manuel Castells
Cicero
Noam Chomsky
Karl W. Deutsch
Walter Fisher
George Gerbner
G. Thomas Goodnight
Jürgen Habermas
Max Horkheimer
Harold Innis
Roman Jakobson
Irving Janis
Wendell Johnson
D. Lawrence Kincaid
Walter Lippman
Juri Lotman
Niklas Luhmann
Herbert Marcuse
George Herbert Mead
Marshall McLuhan
Desmond Morris
Maxwell McCombs
Walter J. Ong
Vance Packard
Charles Sanders Peirce
Chaïm Perelman
Plato
Neil Postman
Nora C. Quebral
Quintilian
I. A. Richards
Everett M. Rogers
Wilbur Schramm
Thomas Sebeok
Claude Shannon
Deborah Tannen
James W. Tankard, Jr.
Warren Weaver
Bob Woodward

See also 

 List of communications-related conferences
 :Category:Communication journals

References

External links 

 A brief history of communication across ages
  Communicating for change and impact
 How Human Communication Fails (Tampere University of Technology)

Communication
Communication

Communication topics
Human communication
Communication